Sulek, Šulek or Sułek are surnames. Notable people with the surname include:

Šulek 
 Bogoslav Šulek (1816–1895), Croatian philologist
 Martin Šulek (born 1998), Slovak footballer 
 Miroslav Šulek (born 1993), Slovak cross-country skier
 Peter Šulek (born 1988), Slovak footballer
 Stjepan Šulek (1914–1986), Croatian musician

Sułek 
 Adrianna Sułek (born 1999), Polish athlete
 Leszek Sułek (born 1954), Polish politician

See also
 

Polish-language surnames
Slovak-language surnames